Lords of Twilight is black metal-band Thy Serpent's MCD and it contains old demo-songs re-recorded and few new songs. It was released through Spinefarm Records in May 1997.

Track listing 
"Prometheus Unbound" - 2:27	
"The Forest of Blåkulla" - 5:24	
"Ode to the Witches (Part IV)" - 1:35	
"In Blackened Dreams" - 7:19	
"As Mist Descends from the Hills" - 2:15	
"Unknown" - 5:17	
"Epic Torment" - 2:44	
"In Blackened Dreams" (Unreleased version) - 03:46	
"Ode to the Witches (Part III)" - 5:18

Line-up 
Sami Tenetz : Guitars, vocals, synths on tracks 8 & 9
Luopio : Bass, synths on tracks 1, 3 & 5
Agathon : Drums on tracks 2, 4 & 6, synths on track 7
Azhemin : Backing vocals, synths on tracks 2, 4 & 6

1997 albums
Thy Serpent albums